Pizzo San Michele is a mountain of Campania, Italy.

Mountains of Campania
Mountains of the Apennines